Tahawai is a rural community in the Western Bay of Plenty District and Bay of Plenty Region of New Zealand's North Island.  runs through it. A peninsula on the eastern side of the area in Tauranga Harbour ends with the small settlements of Tuapiro Point, Ongare Point and Kauri Point, with a walkway between the latter two. A smaller peninsula further north ends at Tanners Point.

Demographics

Tahawai had a population of 1,833 at the 2018 New Zealand census, an increase of 126 people (7.4%) since the 2013 census, and an increase of 90 people (5.2%) since the 2006 census. There were 738 households, comprising 942 males and 891 females, giving a sex ratio of 1.06 males per female. The median age was 54.5 years (compared with 37.4 years nationally), with 234 people (12.8%) aged under 15 years, 222 (12.1%) aged 15 to 29, 870 (47.5%) aged 30 to 64, and 504 (27.5%) aged 65 or older.

Ethnicities were 90.5% European/Pākehā, 10.6% Māori, 1.8% Pacific peoples, 3.6% Asian, and 1.3% other ethnicities. People may identify with more than one ethnicity.

The percentage of people born overseas was 18.7, compared with 27.1% nationally.

Although some people chose not to answer the census's question about religious affiliation, 55.6% had no religion, 30.6% were Christian, 1.1% had Māori religious beliefs, 0.5% were Hindu, 0.2% were Muslim, 0.5% were Buddhist and 2.1% had other religions.

Of those at least 15 years old, 267 (16.7%) people had a bachelor's or higher degree, and 297 (18.6%) people had no formal qualifications. The median income was $30,900, compared with $31,800 nationally. 306 people (19.1%) earned over $70,000 compared to 17.2% nationally. The employment status of those at least 15 was that 726 (45.4%) people were employed full-time, 279 (17.4%) were part-time, and 39 (2.4%) were unemployed.

References

Western Bay of Plenty District
Populated places in the Bay of Plenty Region
Populated places around the Tauranga Harbour